The 2016–17 UCF Knights women's basketball team represented the University of Central Florida during the 2016–17 NCAA Division I basketball season. The Knights compete in Division I of the National Collegiate Athletic Association (NCAA) and the American Athletic Conference (The American). The Knights, in the program's 40th season of basketball, were led by first-year head coach Katie Abrahamson-Henderson, and played their home games at the CFE Arena on the university's main campus in Orlando, Florida. Under Coach Abe, the Knights earned their first 20-win season since 2010-11 as well as their first-ever WNIT bid. They finished the season 21–12, 9–7 in AAC play to finish in fourth place. They advanced to the semifinals of the American Athletic women's tournament where they lost to Connecticut. They received an automatic bid to the Women's National Invitational Tournament where defeated Stetson in the first round before losing to Georgia Tech in the second round.

Media
All UCF games will have an audio or video broadcast available. For conference play, UCF games will typically be available on ESPN3, AAC Digital, or UCF Knights All-Access. Road games not on ESPN3 or AAC Digital will have an audio broadcast available on the UCF Portal. All non-conference home games will be streamed exclusively on UCF Knights All-Access. Select non-conference road games will have a stream available through the opponents website. The audio broadcast for home games will only be available through UCF Knights All-Access.

Roster

Schedule and results

|-
!colspan=12 style="background:#000000; color:#BC9B6A;"| Non-conference regular season

|-
!colspan=12 style="background:#000000; color:#BC9B6A;"| AAC regular season

|-
!colspan=12 style="background:#000000;"| American Athletic Conference Women's Tournament

|-
! colspan="12" style="background:#000000;"| WNIT

See also
 2016–17 UCF Knights men's basketball team

References

External links
 Official Team Website

UCF
UCF Knights women's basketball seasons
2017 Women's National Invitation Tournament participants
UCF Knights
UCF Knights